Bernard Darmet (19 October 1945 – 6 February 2018) was a French cyclist. He competed in the team pursuit at the 1968 Summer Olympics.

References

External links
 

1945 births
2018 deaths
French male cyclists
Olympic cyclists of France
Cyclists at the 1968 Summer Olympics
Sportspeople from Ain
French track cyclists
Cyclists from Auvergne-Rhône-Alpes